Arthur Sneddon was a former wrestler from New Zealand.

He competed at the 1950 British Empire Games where he won the silver medal in the men's light-heavyweight or 90 kg grade.

References

Year of birth missing
Year of death missing
Commonwealth Games silver medallists for New Zealand
Wrestlers at the 1950 British Empire Games
New Zealand male sport wrestlers
Commonwealth Games medallists in wrestling
Medallists at the 1950 British Empire Games